is a Buddhist temple in the city of Konan, Shiga Prefecture, Japan. It belongs to the Tendai school of Japanese Buddhism. Its main image is a hibutsu statue of Jizō Bosatsu.

History
The history of Chōjū-ji is uncertain, as the documentary evidence of its foundation has been lost. The temple's legend states that it was founded by Rōben at the request of Emperor Shōmu during the Tenpyō era (729-749), into order to project the spiritually vulnerable northeastern quadrant from Shigaraki Palace, and also in hopes that he would conceive an heir. In response to this, his consort gave birth to a princess, later known as Empress Kōken. The temple was a substantial establishment with 24 chapels and it was named "Chōjū-ji" as a prayer for the longevity of the princess. A statue of Jizō Bosatsu was carved by Gyōki as the temple's main image.

The Hondō was destroyed in a fire during the Jōgan period (859-877) but was soon rebuilt. The temple was patronized by Minamoto no Yoritomo in the Kamakura period and the Ashikaga clan during the Muromachi period. In the Sengoku period, Oda Nobunaga had the temple's Three-story Pagoda relocated to Sōken-ji near Azuchi Castle, where it remains to this day. The Rōmon was likewise relocated by Nobunaga to a temple called Rendai-ji in what is now Rittō, Shiga, but neither the gate nor the temple have survived.

The temple is seven-minutes by car from Ishibe Station on the JR West Kusatsu Line.

Cultural Properties
 The Main Hall (Hondō) of Chōjū-ji was built towards the end of the Heian period or the start of the Kamakura period. As all documentation has been lost, the exact date is not certain. It is a five by five bay, single-story, yosemune style structure with a three-ken step canopy, and hinoki cypress bark shingled roof. The building was designated a National Treasure in 1953.
 Benten-dō; late Muromachi period (dated 1550), a one x one bay chapel 

The temple also has a number of statues which are  National Important Cultural Properties

 Amida Nyōrai, Heian-period 
 Amida Nyōrai, Heian-period 
 Shaka Nyōrai, Heian period,

Gallery

See also
List of National Treasures of Japan (temples)

References

External links

Visitor's Guide 

Buddhist temples in Shiga Prefecture
Tendai temples
Konan, Shiga
Ōmi Province
7th-century Buddhist temples
National Treasures of Japan
Buddhism in the Nara period